St. Antony's Inter College is a Catholic school in Lucknow, India. Its main campus is located in Jankipuram near Ram Ram bank Chauraha, and a branch is located at Jankivihar Colony, Jankipuram extension.

St. Antony's Inter College was established on 22 January 1990. It is managed by St. Gabriel's Educational Society. The school has been permanently affiliated to the Council for The Indian School Certificate Examination, New Delhi and is now raised to Inter College status. The Director of this college is Mr B Antony.

References

External links
 http://www.stantonyslko.org/

Catholic secondary schools in India
Intermediate colleges in Uttar Pradesh
Christian schools in Uttar Pradesh
Schools in Lucknow
Educational institutions established in 1990
1990 establishments in Uttar Pradesh